Failuna Abdi Matanga (born 28 October 1992) is a Tanzanian long distance runner. She competed in the women's 10,000 metres at the 2017 World Championships in Athletics. In 2019, she competed in the senior women's race at the 2019 IAAF World Cross Country Championships held in Aarhus, Denmark. She finished in 16th place.

In June 2021, she qualified to represent Tanzania at the 2020 Summer Olympics.

References

External links
 

1992 births
Living people
Tanzanian female long-distance runners
Tanzanian female cross country runners
World Athletics Championships athletes for Tanzania
Place of birth missing (living people)
Athletes (track and field) at the 2018 Commonwealth Games
Commonwealth Games competitors for Tanzania
Athletes (track and field) at the 2020 Summer Olympics
Olympic athletes of Tanzania
20th-century Tanzanian women
21st-century Tanzanian women